Praha is a village and municipality in the Lučenec District in the Banská Bystrica Region of Slovakia.

Praha was founded by the Hussites in the 15th century, the name being inspired by the name of Prague, the Czech capital. The Hussite tradition is also reflected on the coat of arms, which shows the characteristic Hussite chalice.

External links
 
http://www.statistics.sk/mosmis/eng/run.html

Villages and municipalities in Lučenec District